The International Rubber Regulation Agreement was a 1934 accord between the United Kingdom, India, the Netherlands, France and Thailand that formed a cartel of major rubber producing nations to restrict global rubber production and maintain a stable, high price for natural rubber. In 1979 a new agreement was formed - an International Natural Rubber Agreement.

Background
Demand for rubber declined sharply after World War I resulting in the British enacting the Stevenson Plan in 1922 to restrict the supply of rubber to support rubber prices and ensure the profitability of British rubber plantations in the Far East. However, the plan had many flaws and was abandoned in 1928. By 1928 the plan both irritated the United States and lacked apparent purpose. Demand for rubber was robust due to expanded use of the automobile in the United States.

After the stock market crash of 1929 the Great Depression hit the United States and rubber demanded once again softened. It was in this context that the International Rubber Regulation Agreement was implemented.

The Agreement
The Agreement was enacted in 1934 between the United Kingdom, India, the Netherlands, France and Thailand to restrict the rubber supply in accordance with the decline of rubber prices to maintain rubber prices and profitability of rubber producing firms. The agreement both prevented establishment of new rubber plantations and placed production restrictions on existing plantations. The agreement in effect formed a cartel of rubber producing nations. To satisfy the interests of the opposite side, the rubber consuming nations, a new institutional body was established: a “Consumer Advisory Council”. Therein representatives of the three leading rubber consuming nations took place: For the United States this was „The Rubber Manufacturers’ Association of America", for Great Britain „The India Rubber Manufacturers’ Association of the United Kingdom" and for Germany the „Reichsverband der deutschen Kautschukindustrie”. Other major rubber consuming states, such as Japan or the Soviet Union, received no representation.

Outcome
The United States tried to become independent of the rubber cartel: establishing rubber plantations in territories under its control; conducting research into rubber-producing plants that thrive in the United States' climate; and reinvigorated efforts to replace natural rubber in tires with a synthetic. In the Fordlandia venture, Henry Ford failed in an attempt to produce rubber in Brazil. The Goodyear Tire and Rubber Company developed plantations in the Philippines and Costa Rica and Harvey Firestone developed plantations in Liberia.

Research into synthetic rubber was limited by lack of knowledge of the chemical structure of rubber compounds until after 1945. DuPont had developed neoprene in the 1920s in response to the Stevenson Plan, but neoprene was too costly for making tires. During this period the International Rubber Research & Development Board and the Research Association of British Rubber Manufacturers were founded.

Also other technologically advanced countries like Germany and the Soviet Union developed in the interwar period synthetic rubber (e.g. Buna. But this was always more expensive than natural rubber.

International Natural Rubber Agreement, 1979
The first and only agreement to come from the United Nations Conference on Trade and Development  Integrated Programme for Commodities was an International Natural Rubber Agreement. The agreement had similar objectives. It introduced the concept of joint responsibility for financing international stock.

References
International Rubber Research & Development Board
History of Natural Rubber (Part 3)
The Story of Rubber:Supply and Demand
Paul R. Samuelson, THE U.S. GOVERNMENT SYNTHETIC RUBBER PROGRAM 1941–1955, Working Paper MIT-EL 76-027WP, Energy Laboratory, Massachusetts Institute of Technology, Cambridge, Massachusetts 02139 (November, 1976)

Notes

Rubber industry
Economic history of the United Kingdom
Economic history of India
History of international trade
Commercial treaties
Interwar-period treaties